Justice Pollock may refer to:

John Calvin Pollock (1857–1937), associate justice of the Supreme Court of Kansas
Stewart G. Pollock (born 1932), associate justice of the New Jersey Supreme Court

See also
Richard W. Pollack (born 1950), associate justice of the Supreme Court of Hawaii
Judge Pollak (disambiguation)